Sitt al-Mulk (970–1023), was a Fatimid princess. After the disappearance of her half-brother, the caliph al-Hakim bi-Amr Allah, in 1021, she was instrumental in securing the succession of her nephew  Ali az-Zahir, and acted as the de facto ruler of the state until her death on 5 February 1023.

Family and early life
She was born in September/October 970 at the palace-city of al-Mansuriya in Ifriqiya (modern Tunisia), to the prince Nizar—the future fifth Fatimid imam–caliph, al-Aziz Billah. Her mother was an unnamed Jarya concubine, who is most likely to be identified with the  frequently mentioned in the sources. Al-Sayyida al-Aziziyya was a Melkite Christian, most likely of Byzantine Greek origin, possibly from a family of the provincial aristocracy of Sicily who were captured in the wars against the Byzantines there sometime before 965. It is known that al-Sayyida al-Aziziyya refused to convert to Islam. Al-Aziz's love for her was great, but scandalized pious Muslim opinion, especially at a time when al-Aziz was at war with the Byzantines in Syria. Her Christian faith reportedly caused suspicion that she was behind his tolerance towards Christians and Jews, which went as far as the appointment of a Christian, Isa ibn Nasturus, as vizier. In 986, two of her brothers were appointed to high office in the Melkite Church: Orestes became Patriarch of Jerusalem, and Arsenios was made metropolitan bishop of Fustat, and later Patriarch of Alexandria. It is still debated among modern scholars whether al-Sayyida al-Aziziyya was also the mother of Sitt al-Mulk's younger brother, and al-Aziz's heir and successor, al-Hakim bi-Amr Allah, but the evidence appears to be against it. When her mother died in November 995, the historian al-Maqrizi reports, Sitt al-Mulk held vigil at her tomb for one month. From her mother the princess inherited a slave girl, Taqarrub, who became her chief confidante and spy in the palace.

One year before the birth of Sitt al-Mulk, the Fatimid armies had conquered Egypt. In 972–973, the Fatimid court moved from Ifriqiya to Egypt to take up residence in their newly built capital, Cairo. Thus Sitt al-Mulk spent her childhood at the palace of Qasr al-Bahr on the shores of the Nile, and later had her own rooms in the Western Palace at Cairo. 

Sitt al-Mulk was doted on by her father, and was his favourite daughter. Al-Aziz lavished gifts and wealth on her, and even put a military unit at her disposal. Her wealth allowed her to fund a number of charitable endowments. She was renowned for her beauty, but, following common Fatimid practice, she remained unmarried to avoid dynastic complications. Sitt al-Mulk inherited her father's open-mindedness and tolerance, and, uniquely among Fatimid palace ladies, appears to have been involved in politics. She exercised considerable influence on him during his reign, as seen by the attempt of the Christian vizier Isa ibn Nasturus, when he was dismissed from his post, to regain his post through her intercession (for which he placed 300,000 dinars at her disposal).

Reign of al-Hakim
Caliph al-Aziz died suddenly at Bilbays on 13 October 996, while preparing an expedition against the Byzantines in northern Syria. His sudden death opened the issue of succession, as the caliph's only surviving son, al-Mansur, was eleven years old. His half-sister Sitt al-Mulk  therefore supported another candidate, an adult son of the prince Abdallah, who had been the first designated heir to Caliph al-Mu'izz li-Din Allah but had died shortly before him, leading to the accession of al-Aziz. According to the Arab chroniclers, she had fallen in love with this otherwise unknown cousin and intended to marry him. The princess reportedly hurried back to Cairo with the senior courtiers and the palace guard to take control of the palace and raise her candidate to the throne, but the eunuch Barjawan, who was al-Mansur's tutor, pre-empted her by putting the crown on the boy's head as soon as news of al-Aziz's death arrived.

Nevertheless, although not much information survives, during the early part of al-Hakim's reign, the relations between Sitt al-Mulk and her brother appear to have been normal and even amicable: in 997, she made him rich gifts, and soon after Barjawan's murder in 1000, which allowed al-Hakim to take over the reins of government himself, he conferred estates with an annual income of 100,000 gold dinars on her. In 1000, al-Hakim even married one of her slave girls. In at least one instance she also intervened to inform her brother, who was rather ignorant of state affairs, of a conspiracy by two senior officials that led to the execution of the vizier Abu'l-Ala Fahd ibn Ibrahim, followed by the extortion of vast sums from tax officials in Palestine. In 1013, she mediated with her brother for a pardon to the Jarrahid chieftain al-Hasan ibn Mufarrij, who had previously risen in revolt against Fatimid rule in Palestine along with his father, Mufarrij ibn Daghfal ibn al-Jarrah.

Soon, however, al-Hakim's reign began to degenerate into terror and arbitrary rule. The state suffered from an increasingly erratic governance, as the Caliph issued a bewildering array of prohibitions ranging from food and singing in public to dogs and baths, launched a persecution of Christians and Jews (culminating in the destruction of the Church of the Holy Sepulchre in 1009), purged the old guard of officials he had inherited from his father, and introduced doctrinal innovations, even to the point of seemingly accepting the divine status accorded to him by some of the Isma'ili faithful (who would later found the Druze sect). 

As a result, the two siblings drifted apart. The princess opposed al-Hakim's intolerant politics, and he was jealous of her, suspecting her of having lovers, including among his generals. The event that most contributed to the rift between the two was connected to the succession: in 1013, al-Hakim chose a cousin, Abd al-Rahim ibn Ilyas, as the designated heir apparent, violating the direct line of succession and overturning a century of precedent of excluding the males of the wider dynasty from all affairs of state. Sitt al-Mulk was committed to the succession of al-Hakim's surviving son Ali, and took him and his mother, the  Ruqayya, into her palace to shield them from the Caliph. The downfall of al-Hakim's erstwhile favourite Malik ibn Sa'id al-Fariqi in 1014/5 is apparently related to this: Malik, who had been raised to head of the judiciary, as chief , and of the Isma'ili hierarchy, as chief , was accused of being close to her (apparently siding with her over the choice of heir), and was executed.

On the night of 13 February 1021, the Caliph disappeared during one of his nightly walks in the streets of Cairo. After a couple of days of search, evidence of his murder was found, and he was declared dead. Of the three contemporary historians to write about these events (and who in turn provided the material for many later historians), the account of the Baghdadi chronicler Hilal al-Sabi directly implicates the princess, writing that after Sitt al-Mulk quarreled with her brother over the direction of the state and the future of the dynasty, she began to fear that he would have her killed. She thus approached the Kutama general Ibn Dawwas, whom the Caliph suspected of being one of her lovers, and conspired with him to have al-Hakim killed, which was done by Ibn Dawwas' slaves. Given the fervently anti-Fatimid bias of Hilal, this account is suspect, but the later historians Sibt ibn al-Jawzi and Ibn Taghribirdi, apparently relying on the second contemporary account, that of the Egyptian Shafi'i  al-Quda'i, report that she ordered the execution of all those who participated in the conspiracy to kill al-Hakim. This has been interpreted by modern historians as an attempt to cover up her involvement. On the other hand, Yahya of Antioch, a Christian who had fled al-Hakim's persecution, mentions nothing of Sitt al-Mulk's involvement in al-Hakim's death. Modern scholars are likely divided, with some, such as Yaacov Lev and Fatema Mernissi, considering her participation as probable, and others, such as Heinz Halm, considering it dubious, since there were many other members of the Fatimid establishment, including Ibn Dawwas, who had an interest in eliminating the erratic caliph. Even Halm admits, however, that the rumours were persistent, and that, as the affair around Malik al-Fariqi shows, al-Hakim did not trust his sister.

Regency
Following the disappearance of al-Hakim, and even before he was declared dead, Sitt al-Mulk moved to establish her control of the court, distributing money to the court dignitaries and military commanders (according to Hilal, with the aid of Ibn Dawwas). Hilal reports that al-Hakim's son Ali was raised to the throne, with the regnal name , only seven days after al-Hakim's disappearance, but all other sources mention that he was crowned on 27 March, with Sitt al-Mulk as the de facto ruler of the state in the meantime. All sources agree that she quickly had Ibn Dawwas executed as the one responsible for al-Hakim's death (and perhaps to cover up her own culpability). This was followed soon after by al-Hakim's designated heir, Abd al-Rahim ibn Ilyas, who was then serving as governor of Damascus: he was lured back to Egypt, imprisoned, and killed.

The new caliph had long been under her tutelage during al-Hakim's reign, and remained so for some time after his coronation, which led to tensions with al-Zahir's mother, Ruqayya. During this early period of al-Zahir's reign, Sitt al-Mulk was the effective governor of the state, known in contemporary sources as 'the Princess-Aunt' or 'the Princess Aziz'. In this capacity, she began to reverse al-Hakim's decisions, and restore orderly government, with a particular attention to the state finances: among other measures, she cancelled the estate grants and salaries that al-Hakim had conferred on his favourites, and restored the customs duties that he had abolished for being un-Islamic. She also reversed her brother's manifold prohibitions, allowing women to leave their homes, and permitting again the listening to music and the drinking of wine. The non-Muslims who had been forced to convert to Islam under al-Hakim were allowed to return to their old faith, and those who had fled the country were allowed to return. 

Historian Yaacov Lev points out that she was able to do so as the result of several factors. On the one hand, while women of the Fatimid dynasty were not usually involved in politics, they were "not secluded from social and economic life", which not only allowed them contact with the world outside the palace, but even necessitated the supervision of the administrative and financial agents acting on their behalf, giving them some experience in such matters. Finally, particularly after the chaos and terror of al-Hakim's last years, the ruling elite was quite prepared to accept direction from her, for they had little left to lose. As Lev writes, in this atmosphere, "machinations and the readiness to shed blood had become accepted ways  of conducting political life, and by these standards, Sitt al-Mulk was a ruler worthy of the name, for she inspired   [i.e., awe]". However, while she was widely praised by medieval chroniclers for both her personal qualities as well as for her sound policies, her position was anomalous, and dependent on the entirely exceptional circumstances. It is unclear how long her regency lasted; the contemporary official and historian al-Musabbihi indicates that power soon passed to a new circle of officials, and that she lost her influence and died in obscurity, while al-Maqrizi indicates that she maintained her control over state affairs until her death.

She also severely persecuted the Druze religion, which believed in al-Hakim's divinity. She succeeded in eliminating it entirely from Egypt, and restricting it to the mountains of Lebanon. She also worked to reduce tensions with the Byzantine Empire over the possession of Aleppo, but before negotiations could be completed, Sitt al-Mulk died of dysentery on 5 February 1023 at the age of fifty-two.

Footnotes

References

Sources

Further reading
 Johanna Awad-Geissler: Die Schattenkalifin. Droemer, München 2007
 
 

970 births
1023 deaths
10th-century people from the Fatimid Caliphate
10th-century Arabs
11th-century people from the Fatimid Caliphate
11th-century women rulers
11th-century Arabs
Egyptian Ismailis
Daughters of Fatimid caliphs
Regents of Egypt